Anubhav Srivastava is an Indian filmmaker and motivational speaker who gained attention as the creator and director of Carve Your Destiny, a documentary film which researched the qualities that make people "successful". Working independently, he interviewed prominent Indian and foreign personalities for his project and his efforts received attention in the Indian and UK media.

Biography

Born in India, Anubhav spent most of his early years in the capital city of New Delhi and studied at St. Columba's School. He created the concept for Carve Your Destiny in 2007, at the age of 21, while pursuing his studies at a university in New Delhi. The project was originally conceived as a possible entry to an international inter-university competition. However, it was rejected at the university as the implementation of the idea was not considered feasible. After the early disappointment, he then decided to pursue the film independently although he was initially doubted due to his young age, lack of relevant contacts and prior filmmaking experience. Anubhav has stated in many interviews that he faced a large number of rejections from people he approached for the film.

In a BBC Radio interview he stated that he had conducted 11 interviews but faced 140 rejections.

The film was released on YouTube and received over 2 million views.

He is now a keynote speaker/trainer and provides training to companies on subjects such as Motivation, Productivity and Sales. 
 He has also written for magazines such as BW Business World and others.

References

External links

Carve Your Destiny the movie by Anubhav Srivastava

Film directors from Delhi
Living people
1986 births
Alumni of the University of Leicester
People from New Delhi
St. Columba's School, Delhi alumni
Indian motivational speakers